Sankt Sigmund im Sellrain is a municipality in western Austria, in the district of Innsbruck-Land in the state of Tyrol located  southeast of Innsbruck, in the deepest part of the Sellrain Valley. It has a large area and the highest elevation. The main source of income is winter tourism.

Population

References

External links

 www.stsigmund.tirol.gv.at - town website

Cities and towns in Innsbruck-Land District